Calliptamus barbarus is a species of short-horned grasshopper in the family Acrididae. It is found in the Palearctic.

Subspecies
These subspecies belong to the species Calliptamus barbarus:
 Calliptamus barbarus barbarus (Costa, 1836)
 Calliptamus barbarus cephalotes Fischer von Waldheim, 1846
 Calliptamus barbarus palaestinensis Ramme, 1930
 Calliptamus barbarus pallidipes Chopard, 1943

References

External links

 

Acrididae
Insects described in 1836